General Foote may refer to:

Alfred F. Foote (1878–1965), Massachusetts National Guard major general
Henry Bowreman Foote (1904–1993), British Army major general
Pat Foote (born 1930), U.S. Army brigadier general
Stephen Miller Foote (1859–1919), U.S. Army brigadier general

See also
Cecil Foott (1876–1942), Australian Army brigadier general